PGA of Sweden National is a golf resort in Bara around  east of central Malmö and about  east of Copenhagen. PGA Sweden National consists of two 18-hole courses, one 9-hole par-3 course as well as hotel, restaurant and a pro shop. It has been named the best Swedish golf club in three consecutive years since 2012 by both members and guests in Golf's survey among 80 Swedish golf courses

Operator
A company, PGA of Sweden National AB (Professional Golfers' Association of Sweden National Aktiebolag), runs the resort and is a Swedish Joint-stock company with headquarters in Ängelholm, Scania in the southern part of Sweden.

History 
The idea of PGA Sweden National started already in 1996, but due to difficulties with local governments, the first course did not open to the public until 2009. Both courses are designed by Kyle Phillips, a golf course architect also known for Yas Links in Abu Dhabi and Kingsbarns Golf Links in Scotland. 

In November 2014, it was announced that Henrik Stenson has bought a significant amount of shares in the company, with the project becoming his first investment in golf resorts. At the same time, plans were announced to expand the resort to include both leisure houses and a new hotel on site.

Golf courses

Lakes Course 
Lakes Course were officially opened to the public on June 29, 2010. It is an open course with water in play on many holes as well as 74 bunkers across the 18 holes. During Nordea Masters, the course measures , par 72.

Links Course 
Links Course is the second 18-hole course on PGA Sweden National. It is inspired by the Scottish links-style golf with many pot bunkers and its undulated greens.

Academy Course 
The 9-hole academy course is open to play for everyone. It is also designed by Kyle Phillips.

PGA Golf Academy 
PGA Sweden National has a golf academy connected to the golf course, led by Scotland-born PGA Professional John Grant, father of Linn Grant. It also boasts the only TaylorMade Performance Lab in Scandinavia.

Tournaments hosted

Notable tournaments hosted 
In 2011, the Challenge Tour tournament The Princess was played at Lakes Course, with Ricardo Santos winning.

In June 2014, Lakes Course hosted the European Tour tournament Nordea Masters, with Thailand's Thongchai Jaidee taking home the trophy. It hosted the tournament again in 2015 with Alex Norén champion.

Professional tournaments

Amateur tournaments

References

External links 

Golf clubs and courses in Sweden
Companies based in Skåne County
Companies established in 2000